Abisko National Park is a National Park in Sweden, established in 1909.

Geography 
Abisko is situated in the Swedish province of Lapland near the Norwegian border (distance approx.  by railway), and belongs to Kiruna Municipality, Sweden's northernmost and largest municipality. The area of the park is 

Permafrost is common in the national park, though permafrost at lower elevations is disappearing because of global warming and increased snowfall.

History 
The park was proposed and established in 1909, the same year Sweden's first laws on nature conservation were created, by a group of prominent Swedish scientists, including the well-known geologist .

The purpose of the Abisko National Park was to "preserve an area with northern Nordic fell nature in its original condition and as a reminiscence for scientific research".  The region has proved to be of much scientific interest, as is shown by the Abisko Scientific Research Station which exists to study the area.  Furthermore, the national park was intended to be a prominent tourist attraction.

Abisko is also home to the Abisko Scientific Research Station, first established in 1903 approximately 31 km west of Abisko in Vassijaure. After a fire in 1910 a new station was built in its present location in Abisko in 1912 and opening in 1913. The research station was incorporated within the Royal Swedish Academy of Sciences in 1935. It is used primarily for biological, climate, ecological, environmental, and geological research and contains on-site laboratories as well as off-site field research stations.

Tourism 
The Nordkalottruta uses trails of the park as part of its longer passage. The Abisko Turiststation, run by the Svenska Turistföreningen (STF), houses many visitors to the park and provides lodging, food, and other amenities, and is one of many similar facilities located periodically along the Kungsleden trail. The national park is known for its cross-country skiing opportunities, snowshoeing, and other winter sports (Mount Nuolja and nearby Björkliden provides backcountry skiing and freeriding opportunities). As its location is 195 km north of the Arctic Circle, summer hikers enjoy the midnight sun, while winter visitors may find the light pollution-free location ideal for viewing the aurora borealis.

Transportation 
Daily passenger electric trains run by SJ AB connect Stockholm with the Norwegian city of Narvik, stopping at both the Abisko village (the name of that railway station is Abisko Östra [east]) and the Abisko Turiststation. Additional regional trains provide links within the Kiruna-Narvik stretch. Abisko is also reachable by car via the highway E10 which links Kiruna and Narvik since early 1980s. Other local forms of local transportation include hiking and dog-sledding in winter. A chair-lift provides access to the summit of nearby Mt. Nuolja.

Animals 
There are many species of birds in the park.

Of the mammals, smaller ones like the marten, stoat, squirrel, the fell lemming and similar are common parts of the fauna. Of larger animals, the moose and reindeer are common, and moose droppings and tracks are found; however, wolverines, Arctic foxes, lynx and bears are only seen sporadically.

Image gallery

References

External links 

 Sweden's National Parks: Abisko National Park from the Swedish Environmental Protection Agency
 Abisko, official site In Swedish, English, Japanese
 Abisko Fauna at the official mountain page of Norrbotten County, www.fjallen.nu
 Abisko Scientific Research Station
 Photos of Abisko National Park
 Photo Hiking Guide of Abisko National Park

National parks of Sweden
Protected areas established in 1909
1909 establishments in Sweden
Geography of Norrbotten County
Tourist attractions in Norrbotten County
Lapland (Sweden)